This is a list of amphibians found in Belize. 37 amphibian species have been recorded in Belize.
This list is derived from the database listing of AmphibiaWeb.

Salamanders (Caudata)

Caudata
Order: Caudata – Family: Plethodontidae
Bolitoglossa mexicana (LC)
Oedipina elongata (LC)

Frogs and toads (Anura)

Bufonidae
Order: Anura – Family: Bufonidae
Incilius campbelli (LC)
Incilius valliceps (LC)
Rhinella marina (LC)

Centrolenidae
Order: Anura – Family: Centrolenidae
Hyalinobatrachium fleischmanni (LC)

Craugastoridae
Order: Anura – Family: Craugastoridae
Craugastor chac (NT)
Craugastor laticeps (NT)
Craugastor loki (LC)
Craugastor psephosypharus (VU)
Craugastor rhodopis (VU)
Craugastor sabrinus (EN)
Craugastor sandersoni (EN)

Eleutherodactylidae
Order: Anura – Family: Eleutherodactylidae
Eleutherodactylus leprus (VU)

Hylidae
Order: Anura – Family: Hylidae
Agalychnis callidryas (LC)
Agalychnis moreletii (CR)
Bromeliohyla bromeliacia (EN)
Dendropsophus ebraccatus (LC)
Dendropsophus microcephalus (LC)
Ecnomiohyla valancifer (CR)
Scinax staufferi (LC)
Smilisca baudinii (LC)
Smilisca cyanosticta (NT)
Tlalocohyla loquax (LC)
Tlalocohyla picta (LC)
Trachycephalus venulosus (LC)
Triprion petasatus (LC)

Leptodactylidae
Order: Anura – Family: Leptodactylidae 
Engystomops pustulosus (LC)
Leptodactylus fragilis (LC)
Leptodactylus melanonotus (LC)

Microhylidae
Order: Anura – Family: Microhylidae
Gastrophryne elegans (LC)
Hypopachus variolosus (LC)

Ranidae
Order: Anura – Family: Ranidae
Rana berlandieri (LC)
Rana juliani (NT)
Rana maculata (LC)
Rana vaillanti (LC)

Rhinophrynidae
Order: Anura – Family: Rhinophrynidae
Rhinophrynus dorsalis (LC)

See also
Fauna of Belize

Notes

References

 
Amphibians
Belize
Belize